Animal rescue or pet rescue may refer to:

 Animal rescue group, organizations dedicated to the rescue of animals, including pets, from shelters, to homes
 Animal Rescue Foundation, San Francisco Bay Area based charity dedicated to pet adoption and other animal welfare works
 Animal sanctuary, sites dedicated to caring permanently for rescued wild or domestic animals
 Animal welfare, a general term for the well-being of animals, more specifically the idea of activism towards increasing the well-being of animals
 International Animal Rescue, international organization dedicated to animal welfare
 Pet adoption, adoption of pets that have been abandoned by previous owners
 Rescue dog, dogs placed in homes, from shelters
 Wildlife rehabilitation, the process of caring for wild animals, with the intent of returning them to their natural environment

Entertainment
 RSPCA Animal Rescue, Australian reality TV series
 Pet Rescue, British reality TV series
 Animal Rescue, U.S. reality TV series
 The Drop, previously titled Animal Rescue, 2014 film
 Pet Rescue Saga, a mobile game

See also
 Animal rights
 Animal shelter
 Rescue (disambiguation)